Mary O'Leary may refer to:

 Mary O'Leary (producer), American soap opera producer
 Mary O'Leary (camogie), former camogie player
 Mary O'Leary (Big Brother), reality show contestant
 Liz Truss, British former Prime Minister, whose birth name was Mary and is married to Hugh O'Leary